Cirencester Grammar School (CGS) was a grammar school in Cirencester, Gloucestershire, England, founded in about 1461 and closed in 1966.

History
The principal founder of the school was John Chadworth (d. 1471), Bishop of Lincoln. He is recorded in Lincoln Cathedral as a "Gloucester Man". He was educated at Oxford and was afterwards a Fellow and Provost of King's College, Cambridge.

Princess Alexandra of Kent visited the school on 23 July 1958 as part of its quincentenary celebrations.

Closure
The school finally closed in July 1966, at the end of the summer term, as part of a reorganisation of county schools. In September 1966 its forms became part of the Cirencester School, combining with pupils from the Deer Park Secondary Modern School, and the new First Form entrants for 1966 went directly to the Deer Park site. Eventually the old Cirencester Grammar School forms all moved there, also.

The School's Victoria Road buildings still survive much as they were in 1966. They were taken over by a junior school (previously in Lewis Lane), which was subsequently joined by a primary school. The junior school closed in July 2010

Notable former pupils

 Dr Vernon Ellis Cosslett, physicist and former president of the Association of University Teachers and the Royal Microscopical Society
 William Court, Professor of Economic History at the University of Birmingham from 1947 to 1970 and president of the Economic History Society from 1969 to 1970
 James Dallaway (1763–1834), antiquary, topographer and writer.
 Wally Hammond, cricketer whose centenary was celebrated at a reunion in Cirencester in 2003.
 Edward Jenner, who invented inoculation to control infectious diseases.
 Prof Christopher Price, president of the Association for Clinical Biochemistry from 2003 to 2006
 Prof Clement John Tranter CBE, mathematician
 Raymond Fletcher was presented with the OBE by Queen Elizabeth II in 2004 for Services to Disabled People.

Notable staff
Sir Peter Maxwell Davies was music master at the school from 1959 to 1962, and it was here that he started his lifelong association with writing works for non-specialist children to perform. He wrote many works for the school's orchestra and choir, including O magnum mysterium. The school took part in the 1962 Bath Festival, with Yehudi Menuhin playing a composition by Sixth former Stephen Arnold.

Head masters
 to 1880: Rev. William Bartram
 to 1945: Mr W. N. Weech
1945–1949: Captain Peter Gedge
1949–1954: Douglas Whiting, later head of Cheadle Hulme School and Director of Voluntary Service Overseas
1954–1961: John Vernon Bartlett, later head of Culham Teacher Training College

References

Defunct schools in Gloucestershire
1461 establishments in England
Defunct grammar schools in England
Educational institutions disestablished in 1966
Educational institutions established in the 15th century
1966 disestablishments in England